The Toth Duo was founded in 1972 by two members of the New Hungarian Quartet: Andor Toth, violin and Andor Toth Jr., cello. The Toth Duo recorded  a significant album of Duos for Violin and Cello on the ECLECTRA label. The Duo actively performed until the death of Andor Toth Jr. in 2002.

References

Selected discography 
 ECLECTRA Records, 1999: Duos For Violin And Cello / Toth Duo
Duo for Violin and Cello, Op. 7 by Zoltán Kodály
Duo for Violin and Cello no 1, H 157 by Bohuslav Martinů
Sonata for Violin and Cello by Maurice Ravel

 CD Universe - Duos For Violin And Cello / Toth Duo CD 
Duo for Violin and Cello, Op. 7 by Zoltán Kodály
Duo for Violin and Cello no 1, H 157 by Bohuslav Martinů
Sonata for Violin and Cello by Maurice Ravel

Chamber music groups
American classical music groups